The 2010 FIVB Volleyball World League qualification was a qualification tournament to determine the final two spots for the 2010 World League. It was held from 21 August to 19 September 2009.

Teams

Pool standing procedure
 Match points
 Number of matches won
 Points ratio
 Sets ratio
 Result of the last match between the tied teams

Match won 3–0 or 3–1: 3 match points for the winner, 0 match points for the loser
Match won 3–2: 2 match points for the winner, 1 match point for the loser

First round
All times are local.

Leg 1

Leg 2

Second round
All times are local.

Leg 1

Leg 2

External links
Official website

FIVB Volleyball World League
2010
FIVB World League